"Ex's and Oh's" is the lead single from American metalcore band Atreyu's third album, A Death-Grip On Yesterday, released in 2006. It is Atreyu's second single from 2006, but first from the album, as "Her Portrait In Black" was also released, which created for the soundtrack to Underworld: Evolution. The lyrics deal with the former alcohol addiction of vocalist Alex Varkatzas. This song is included on the video game Madden NFL 07 (however, it is edited).  It is also a master recording playable on Guitar Hero II as an Xbox 360 downloadable track. A part of the song was played on an episode of Parental Control.

The song charted on the Billboard Hot Mainstream Rock Tracks chart, peaking at number 24.  It is one of Atreyu's most famous songs, and is a staple of their live set. Varkatzas often uses audience participation when performing the song.

An instrumental version was heard in the Universal Technical Institute vignette that aired during Nitro Circus Live on MTV2.

The song was featured in the beginning of the eighth episode of the first season of Jersey Shore, "One Shot."

Track listing

References

Atreyu (band) songs
2006 singles
2006 songs
Victory Records singles
Song recordings produced by Josh Abraham